Jason Eric Massey (January 7, 1973 – April 3, 2001) was an American murderer who was executed in 2001 for the murders of two teenagers.

Background
Massey was born on January 7, 1973, in Ellis County, Texas. He was neglected and abused by his alcoholic father and his drug-addicted mother. By his teens, he was a juvenile delinquent with a lengthy criminal record, mostly for torturing animals and stalking. His mother once committed him to a psychiatric hospital after discovering his journals, in which he detailed his fantasies about rape and murder, his hero worship of Charles Manson, his avowed Satanism, and his strong desire to become a serial killer. Massey was known to decapitate and mutilate dogs, cats, and cows, preserving their skulls in coolers as trophies.

Crime
On July 27, 1993, Massey murdered two teenagers: 14-year-old James Brian King and his 13-year-old stepsister, Christina Benjamin, in his hometown. He cut off Christina's head, hands and nipples, mutilated her genitals, and removed her intestines. He shot King twice in the head. On July 29, both their bodies were found in a field near Telico by a road worker. There was evidence of sexual mutilation and some of the body parts were missing, which have never been found.

Massey was quickly connected to the crime by forensic evidence and arrested, shortly after getting out of jail for animal cruelty. In October of the following year, he was found guilty of capital murder.

The prosecution sought a death sentence for Massey. During the sentencing phase, they had Dr. Dekleva, the psychiatrist who had previously examined Massey, testify. He talked about the contents of Massey's journal, and said the most concerning part of it was when the writing shifted from fantasy to reality. Massey wrote about planning his murders by talking about how to evade detection to the police and purchasing weapons. Dr. Dekleva said there was no possible treatment for an individual like Massey, and that he was a lasting threat to society who would almost certainly kill again.

A former teacher and classmate of Massey also testified about his disturbing behavior. His classmate said he repeatedly threatened her. It was later revealed that Massey had killed and mutilated her dog, before spreading its blood on her car.

A witness testified that while he was walking in the woods, he had found a cooler containing animal bones, primarily skulls and jawbones. There were also journals labeled "Slayer's Book of Death," volumes 1-4. In these journals, Massey talked about his plan to become a serial killer. In one entry, he wrote that he planned to kill 700 people within 20 years. In another, he wrote that he had killed 73 cats and dogs, as well as seven cows.

It took jurors only 15 minutes to order his execution. While on death row, he reportedly converted to Christianity.

Execution
Massey was executed by lethal injection on April 3, 2001. Before his execution, he confessed his crime to the murdered teenagers' family and apologized. His last meal consisted of three fried chicken quarters, fried squash, fried egg plant, mashed potatoes, snap peas, boiled cabbage, three bits of corn on the cob with spinach, broccoli and butter, and one pint of ice cream, served with a pitcher of sweet tea.

In popular culture
Massey's crime was documented on an episode of the TV series Forensic Files called "Pure Evil". It is one of the few episodes rated TV-MA.

See also
 Capital punishment in Texas
 Capital punishment in the United States
 List of people executed in Texas, 2000–2009
 List of people executed in the United States in 2001

References

1973 births
2001 deaths
1993 murders in the United States
American people executed for murder
People convicted of murder by Texas
People executed by Texas by lethal injection
21st-century executions of American people
21st-century executions by Texas
Crimes involving Satanism or the occult
People from Ellis County, Texas
Executed people from Texas
American murderers of children
American people convicted of cruelty to animals
People with antisocial personality disorder